The Taipa Houses–Museum is housed in a set of old houses in Taipa, Macau, China.

The museum complex consists of five houses, of which four display various artefacts and exhibits on life during Macau's colonial era while another serves as an event venue. The houses were built in 1921. These colonial residences were restored to recreate houses of well-off Portuguese families living in Macau during the first half of the 20th century. The last house was restored in 1999. The Taipa Houses–Museum opened on 5 December 1999 and is administered by the Cultural Affairs Bureau.

The houses used to look out over the sea, but due to land reclamation of the Cotai area between Taipa and Coloane. This body of water is now a small wetland.

Every autumn, the Cultural Affairs Bureau organises the Lusofonia Festival at the open space outside the museums.

See also
 List of museums in Macau

References

External links

 The Taipa Houses-Museum website 
 The Taipa Houses-Museum website 
 The Taipa Houses-Museum website 
 The Taipa Houses-Museum website 

Houses completed in 1921
Museums established in 1999
Museums in Macau
Taipa
1999 establishments in Macau
Portuguese colonial architecture in China